KWKM may refer to:

 KWKM (FM), a radio station (95.7 FM) licensed to St. Johns, Arizona, United States
 KWKM-LP, a defunct low-power television station (channel 10) formerly licensed to Show Low, Arizona